Jane Frances Gerick (23 April 1963 – 25 December 2003) was an Australian politician. She served for one term as a Labor member of the Australian House of Representatives from 1998 to 2001, representing the division of Canning, Western Australia.

Early life
Gerick was born on 23 April 1963 in Meekatharra, Western Australia. Her father, whom she described in her maiden speech as "one of the major influences on my life", died when she was a teenager. She grew up in the remote mining town of Wiluna.

Gerick completed the degree of Bachelor of Education at Curtin University and a diploma in teaching at the Western Australian College of Advanced Education. She worked as a schoolteacher from 1984 to 1990, then was the owner of the City Business College, an adult training provider in Perth.

Politics
Gerick served as secretary of the ALP's Armadale sub-branch from 1991 to 1998 and was a delegate to ALP state and national conferences.

Gerick was elected to federal parliament as one of several new Labor MPs at the 1998 federal election; her party rebounded strongly from its landslide defeat at the 1996 federal election but narrowly failed to win back government. Gerick defeated one term Liberal MP Ricky Johnston. She won with 53.5% of the two party preferred vote.  However, a redistribution during the next term scaled back her majority to an extremely marginal 0.4%. A slight drop in the Labor vote to 49.9% at the 2001 federal election saw Gerick defeated by Liberal candidate Don Randall.

Personal life
In February 2001 Gerick was diagnosed with acute myeloid leukemia. In 2003 she was endorsed for a re-match against Randall for an election due the following year. However, Gerick died of a brain haemorrhage on Christmas Day 2003.

References

1963 births
2003 deaths
Members of the Australian House of Representatives
Members of the Australian House of Representatives for Canning
Australian Labor Party members of the Parliament of Australia
Women members of the Australian House of Representatives
People from Meekatharra, Western Australia
20th-century Australian politicians
21st-century Australian politicians
21st-century Australian women politicians
20th-century Australian women politicians
Curtin University alumni
Australian schoolteachers